Prema Kiran (1961 - 1 May 2022) was an Indian film actress and producer who mainly works in Marathi cinema. Prema Kiran was known for role Ambakka in 1985 Marathi language film Dhoom Dhadaka, She also works in De Danadan (1987), Utavala Navra (1989), Madness (2001), Arjun Deva (2001), Kunku jhale Vairi (2005). In the last few years Prema appeared on Zee Marathi Channel's program He Tar Kahich Nay

Career 
Kiran was started her film career with the 1985 Marathi movie Dhoom Dhadaka. Later, she played lead roles in De Danadan, Irsal Karti, Pagalpan, Arjun Deva, Kunku Jhale Vairi and Lagnachi Varaat Londonachya Gharat. Also Mahercha Aher, Gadbad Ghotala, Saubhagyavati Sarpanch are among his films. 

Along with acting, Prema Kiran has also produced films like Uthavala Navara (1989), Tharkaap. Apart from this, he also acted in Gujarati, Bhojpuri, Awadhi and Banjara language films.

Filmography

Death 
Prema Kiran died in the early hours of May 1, 2022 in Mumbai due to a heart attack aged at 61.

References

External links 

 
1961 births
2022 deaths
Indian actresses